Niehl is a Stadtteil (quarter) of the city of Cologne, Germany. Situated north of the city centre, on the left bank of the Rhine, it is part of the district of Nippes.

The largest employer in Cologne is Ford Europe, which has its European headquarters and a factory in Niehl (Ford-Werke GmbH)

References

Nippes, Cologne
Boroughs and quarters of Cologne